Temple Beth Elohim is a Reform synagogue located at 230 Screven Street in Georgetown, South Carolina.

In the early 1760s, Abraham Cohen (1739-1800) and his younger brother Solomon Cohen Sr. (1757-1835), were the first Portuguese Jews (Sephardim) to arrive and settle in Georgetown (Parish) District, South Carolina.  Moses Cohen (1709-1762) their father, emigrated to colonial America with a small group of impoverished Portuguese Jews, with eldest son Abraham age ten, circa 1750 from London, England into Charleston, South Carolina.  Moses Cohen was the first religious leader of the small congregation of Jews, known as Kahal Kadosh Beth Elohim.  They used old established Portuguese Rituals used in Bevis Marks, the place of worship for Sephardim in London.  Charles Patrick Daly in his work; The Settlement of the Jews in North America wrote, "They formed themselves into a religious society in 1750, worshipping for seven years in a small wooden house in Union near Queen Street, each year bringing an accession to their numbers".

Abraham Cohen and a small number of (Sephardim) Portuguese Jews "worshipped in each other's homes and also at the Winyah Indigo Society" in Prince George's Parish (Georgetown District) according to the book, Shared Traditions; Southern History and Folk Culture by Charles Joyner.  Cohen the eldest child of Moses Cohen was a Vendu-master (Aunctioneer), he "lived on Prince Street in Georgetown Parish (District) with Free Peggy [Margaret)  McWharter (b. abt. 1745-d. 1806) a Free Person of Color," owned a Blacksmith shop and also served as first United States Postmaster.  Abraham Cohen along with his sister Esther Cohen Myers and her husband Mordecai Myers are buried in Beth Elohim Cemetery, which Cohen "helped to establish in 1772, twenty-eight years before he was laid to rest there".  However, the grave marker for younger brother Solomon Cohen (1757-1835) can be found in Chatham County, Georgia at Laurel Grove Cemetery.  Solomon Cohen Jr. (1802-1875),  the son of Solomon Cohen Sr (1757-1835) was the first Portuguese Jew born in Georgetown, South Carolina.  He became a lawyer and later moved his widowed mother Bella Moses Cohen and wife Miriam Gratz Moses to Savannah, Georgia circa 1840, around the time of the so-called "Organ Controversy," involving the installation of a musical organ and music in Kahal Kodosh Beth Elohim, then an Orthodox place of worship in Charleston.  Mordecai Myers the husband of Esther Cohen and brother n' law of Abraham Cohen, arrived in Georgetown (Parish) District about the same time.  Abraham Cohen, Solomon Cohen Sr, and Mordecai Myers became prominent Planters in the colonial economy of Indigo, and growing rice, including auctioning and ownership of enslaved Kissi (Geechee) people from West Africa.   For years they worshipped at home or the Winyah Indigo Society building.

History 

Congregation Beth Elohim in Georgetown, South Carolina's constitution was signed October 30, 1904 and the building opened in 1906. Temple Beth Elohim, in Georgetown, South Carolina as a place of worship was not organized until 1904, more than one hundred years after Abraham Cohen (1739-1800) the Portuguese Jew born in London, England and son of Moses Cohen of Charleston was buried in Beth Elohim cemetery in Georgetown, South Carolina, alongside his sister Esther Cohen Myers and her husband Mordecai Myers.

The Temple Beth Elohim building and place of worship located just blocks away from historic Beth Elohim cemetery founded in 1772 by Abraham Cohen and others, the cemetery is directly across from the old Bethel African Methodist Episcopal (AME) Church, built after Emancipation.

Current status 

Temple Beth Elohim organized in 1904 is an active Reform congregation with approximately 50 members and weekly Sabbath (Shabbat) services on Friday nights at 7:30 p.m.

References 

New York Public Library. 1897. Bulletin of the New York Public Library. New York: New York Public Library. P. 763.
Stephen Goldring / Malcom Woldenberg, Institute of Southern Jewish Life: Encyclopedia of Southern Jewish Communities - Georgetown, South Carolina
DaCosta, Isaac, Noble Families among the Sephardic Jews, Oxford University Press, London, 1936.
Daly, Charles Patrick, The Settlement of the Jews in North America, President of The American Geographical Society, New York, 1893.
Elzas, Barnett Abraham, The Jews of South Carolina: From the Earliest Times to the Present Day, J. B.  Lippincott Company, Philadelphia, 1905.
Joyner, Charles, Shared Traditions; Southern History and Folk Culture, University of Illinois Press, 1999.
Pasha, Sadie Day, Author, Cohen of Georgetown County, South Carolina 1760-1960: A Family History of Low Country Secret Jews and descendants in America, the manuscript (Pasha, S. 2010)
Pasha, Sadie, Guest Speaker, Temple Beth Elohim, Georgetown, SC, May 9, 2014, "Abraham Cohen of Prince Street: A Biographical Sketch", (Pasha, S. 2010)
Rosengarten, Dale, Guest Speaker, Kaminski House, Georgetown, SC, September 12, 2014, Southern Jewish Historical Society, "Abraham Cohen of Prince Street", (Pasha, S. 2010)

External links 

 Goldring / Woldenberg Institute of Southern Jewish Life
 Jewish Historical Society of South Carollna, College of Charleston, Charleston, South Carolina
 Southern Jewish Historical Society, College of Charleston Library, Special Collections, Charleston, South Carolina
 Kahal Kadosh Beth Elohim, Charleston, South Carolina

Synagogues in South Carolina
Buildings and structures in Georgetown, South Carolina
Reform synagogues in South Carolina
Sephardi Reform Judaism
Sephardi synagogues
German-American culture in South Carolina
German-Jewish culture in the United States
Portuguese-American history
Sephardi Jewish culture in South Carolina
Jewish organizations established in 1905
1905 establishments in South Carolina
Synagogues completed in 1949
1949 establishments in South Carolina